Tulasi Vivaha, also called Tulasi Kalyanam, is a Hindu festival, in which a ceremonial wedding of the goddess Tulasi (The personification of the holy basil, a form of Lakshmi) with a shaligrama or an amla branch (The personifications of Vishnu) is held. The Tulasi wedding signifies the end of the monsoon, and the beginning of the wedding season in Hinduism.

The ceremonial festival is performed anytime between Prabodhini Ekadashi (the eleventh or twelfth lunar day of the bright fortnight of the Hindu month of Kartika) and Kartika Purnima (the full moon of the month). The day varies regionally.

Legend

Hindu texts such as the Skanda Purana, Padma Purana, as well as the Shiva Purana feature Tulasi in the tale of Vrinda and her husband, Jalandhara. Vrinda is the daughter of Kalanemi, an asura. Vrinda is described to be pious, and a great devotee of the god Vishnu. Jalandhara, an asura born from Shiva's rage, marries her. Angered by the outcome of the Samudra Manthana, Jalandhara wages a successful war on the devas, conquering Svarga, and ruling as a virtuous monarch. However, after hearing details of Parvati's beauty from Narada, he demands Shiva hand her over to him. Infuriated, Shiva declares war on the asura, but finds him to be an invincible foe. After employing his illusory arts, the asura attempts to abduct Parvati in the guise of Shiva. She prays to Vishnu, and makes him realise that the asura was shielded from defeat by the chastity of his wife.

Vrinda receives an ominous nightmare where she sees her husband seated on a buffalo, the sky enveloped in darkness, and a sun without lustre. Terrified of what it implied, she ran from forest to forest, forgetting herself. When a sage rescues her from two rakshasas, she begs him to inform her of the tidings of her husband's battle with Shiva. The sage's disciples produce the asura's hands, a head, and a headless trunk, upon which she falls into despair. She urges the sage to resuscitate her fallen husband, which he does. Witnessing her slain husband return to life, Vrinda sported with him for several days, until she realised his true identity. She cursed Vishnu that his wife, too, would be separated from him (Which happens when Sita is abducted by Ravana) and self-immolates, even as the deity attempts to stop her. Her chastity broken, Shiva prevails over Jalandhara.

After the conclusion of the battle, Vishnu is still traumatised by the death of the beautiful Vrinda, and refuses to move from her pyre. The devas invoke Prakriti, the personified force of nature, who offers them three seeds to be planted where Vishnu stays, which represent the sattva, rajas, and tamas gunas. The seeds grow to become three plants, Dhātrī, Mālatī, and Tulasī, who are personified as three women, Svarā, Lakṣmī, and Gaurī. Vishnu grows infatuated by the sight of these wondrous women. Since Mālatī is regarded to be jealous of Vishnu's shakti, (She is born from Lakshmi's divine energy, and the goddess of prosperity herself is also regarded to be Vishnu's divine energy) she is condemned. The goddesses of Dhātrī and Tulasī, however, bear genuine love for Vishnu, and make him forget about his misery. They accompany Vishnu to Vaikuntha, and greatly please and delight him.

In a variation of this legend, Vrinda immolates herself in her husband's funeral pyre, but Vishnu ensures that she is incarnated in the form of the tulasi plant upon the earth. She gains the status of a goddess named Tulasi, while her earthly form is the tulasi plant.

In popular tradition, in accordance to a blessing by Vishnu to marry Vrinda in her next birth, Vishnu – in the form of shaligrama - married Tulasi on Prabodhini Ekadashi. To commemorate this event, the ceremony of Tulasi Vivaha is performed.

Another minor legend narrates that Lakshmi slew a demon on this day, and remained on earth as the tulasi plant.

A Vaishnava legend relates Tulasi to the Samudra Manthana, the churning of the cosmic ocean by the devas and asuras. At the end of the churning, Dhanvantari rose from the ocean with amrita (the elixir of immortality). Vishnu procures it for the devas, and successfully denies it to the asuras. Vishnu is regarded to have shed happy tears, the first of which fell inside the amrita, and formed Tulasi, who the former married.

Celebrations 

The wedding ceremony of Tulasi to Vishnu/Krishna resembles the traditional Hindu wedding. The wedding ceremony is conducted at homes and at temples where a fast is observed on the Tulasi Vivaha day until evening, when the ceremony begins. A mandapam (marriage booth) is built around the courtyard of the house where the Tulasi plant is usually planted in centre of the courtyard in a brick plaster called the Tulasi Vrindavana. It is believed that the soul of Vrinda resides in the plant at night and leaves in the morning. The bride Tulasi is clothed with a sari and ornaments including earrings and necklaces. A human paper face with a bindi and nose-ring may be attached to Tulasi. The groom is a brass image or picture of Vishnu, Krishna, Balarama, or more frequently the shaligrama stone - the symbol of Vishnu. The image is clothed in a dhoti. Both Vishnu and Tulasi are bathed and decorated with flowers and garlands before the wedding. The couple is linked with a cotton thread (mala) in the ceremony.

India

Bihar 

At Prabhu Dham in Saunja, India, the festival is collectively celebrated by whole village which makes it a significant point of attraction. Here it is celebrated as three day festival in the Hindi month of Kartik from Ekadashi to Trayodashi. The festival is started with the Vedic chanting of Ramcharitmanas or Ramayana by the villagers itself. The second day is celebrated as Sobha Yatra which is of significant importance in which the special prasad is Pongal, and the third day is celebrated as Tilakotsava and Vivahotsava of Vishnu and Vrinda. The villagers prepare 56 types of prasada known as Chapan Bhog and distributed to all. All classes participate in this village accordingly. Devotees including saints and mahants all over from Bihar visit this place to celebrate this festive occasion.

Maharashtra 
In Maharashtra, an important ritual in the ceremony is when the white cloth is held between the bride and the groom and the saint recites the Mangal Ashtaka mantras. These mantras formally complete the wedding. Rice mixed with vermilion is showered by the attendees on Tulasi and Vishnu at the end of the recitation of the mantras with the word "Savadhan" (literally "be careful" implying "You are united now". The white curtain is also removed. The attendees clap signifying approval to the wedding. Vishnu is offered sandalwood-paste, men's clothing and the sacred thread. The bride is offered saris, turmeric, vermilion and a wedding necklace called Mangal-sutra, worn by married women. Sweets and food cooked for an actual wedding are cooked for Tulasi Vivaha too. This ceremony is mostly performed by women. The prasad of sugar-cane, coconut chips, fruits and groundnut is distributed to devotees.

The expenses of the wedding are usually borne by a daughter-less couple, who act as the parents of Tulasi in the ritual wedding. The giving away of the daughter Tulasi (kanyadaan) to Krishna is considered meritorious to the couple. The bridal offerings to Tulasi are given to a Brahmin priest or female ascetics after the ceremony.

Gujarat 
In two Rama temples in Saurashtra, the ceremony is more elaborate. An invitation card is sent to the groom's temple by the bride's temple. On Prabodhini Ekadashi, a barat bridal procession of Lalji - an image of Vishnu - sets off to the bride's temple. Lalji is placed in a palanquin and accompanied by singing and dancing devotees. The barat is welcomed on the outskirts of Tulsi's village and the ceremonial marriage is carried at the temple. At the bride's side, Tulasi is planted in an earthen pot for the ceremony. People desirous of children perform Kanyadaan from Tulsi's side acting as her parents. Bhajans are sung throughout the night and in the morning the barat of Lalji returns to their village with Tulasi.

Andhra Pradesh and Telangana 
Tulasi Kaḷyāṇaṁ (తులసి కళ్యాణం) is mainly celebrated on Kartika Shukla Dvadashi (the 12th day of the Kartika month's waxing moon phase) or Utthana Dwadashi or Ksheerabdhi Dwadashi. Vishnu is worshipped in the form of an amla plant. A branch of the amla tree is placed in the Tulasi Vrindavan. Tulasi is decorated like a bride, complete with jewellery. A puja is performed with the Shodashopachara, which is sometimes substituted with other forms of Upachara.

See also
 Tulasi in Hinduism
 Tulasi Pujan Divas
Tulasi Vrindavana

References

Tulasi kalyana

Hindu holy days
Marriage in Hinduism
Rituals in Hindu worship
Plants in Hinduism
October observances
November observances
Hindu festivals